The following were the events of Volleyball for the year 2017 throughout the world.

Beach volleyball

World and continental beach volleyball events
 June 15 – 18: 2017 European U22 Beach Volleyball Championships in  Baden bei Wien
 Winners:  (Oleg Stoyanovskiy & Artem Yarzutkin) (m) /  (Svetlana Kholomina & Nadezda Makroguzova) (f)
 July 11 – 16: 2017 FIVB Beach Volleyball U21 World Championships in  Nanjing
 Winners:  (Adrielson dos Santos Silva & Renato Andrew Lima de Carvalho) (m) /  (Eduarda Santos Lisboa & Ana Patricia Silva Ramos) (f)
 July 28 – August 6: 2017 Beach Volleyball World Championships in  Vienna
 Winners:  (André Stein & Evandro Oliveira) (m) /  (Laura Ludwig & Kira Walkenhorst) (f)
 August 16 – 20: 2017 European Beach Volleyball Championships in  Jūrmala
 Winners:  (Daniele Lupo & Paolo Nicolai) (m) /  (Nadja Glenzke & Julia Großner) (f)
 August 22 – 27: 2017 Swatch Beach Volleyball FIVB World Tour Finals in  Hamburg
 Winners:  (Phil Dalhausser & Nick Lucena) (m) /  (Laura Ludwig & Kira Walkenhorst) (f)
 August 24 – 27: 2017 European U18 Beach Volleyball Championships in  Kazan
 Winners:  (Pavel Shustrov & Alexey Gusev) (m) /  (Maria Voronina & Mariia Bocharova) (f)
 September 7 – 10: 2017 European U20 Beach Volleyball Championships in  Vulcano
 Winners:  (Vasilii Ivanov & Sergey Gorbenko) (m) /  (Maria Voronina & Mariia Bocharova) (f)

FIVB Beach Volleyball World Tour
 February 7 – October 23: 2017 FIVB Beach Volleyball World Tour

2017 Swatch Major Series (Five Star BV events)
 February 7 – 12: Major #1 in  Fort Lauderdale, Florida
 Winners:  (Saymon Barbosa Santos & Álvaro Morais Filho) (m) /  (Larissa França & Talita Antunes) (f)
 June 27 – July 2: Major #2 in  Poreč
 Winners:  (Gustavo Albrecht Carvalhaes & Pedro Solberg Salgado) (m) /  (Sarah Pavan & Melissa Humana-Paredes) (f)
 July 4 – 9: Major #3 (final) in  Gstaad
 Winners:  (Phil Dalhausser & Nick Lucena) (m) /  (Julia Sude & Chantal Laboureur) (f)

2017 Four Star BV events
 May 18 – 21: Four Star #1 in  Rio de Janeiro
 Winners:  (Alison Cerutti & Bruno Oscar Schmidt) (m) /  (Ágatha Bednarczuk & Eduarda Santos Lisboa) (f)
 May 23 – 28: Four Star #2 in  Lucerne
 Event cancelled, due to financial issues.
 July 19 – 23: Four Star #3 (final) in  Olsztyn
 Winners:  (Markus Böckermann & Lars Flüggen) (m) /  (Larissa França & Talita Antunes) (f)

2017 Three Star BV events
 February 15 – 18: Three Star #1 in  Kish Island (men only)
 Winners:  (Nikita Lyamin & Viacheslav Krasilnikov)
 April 19 – 23: Three Star #2 in  Xiamen
 Winners:  (Alexander Brouwer & Robert Meeuwsen) (m) /  (Bárbara Seixas & Fernanda Alves) (f)
 May 31 – June 4: Three Star #3 in  Moscow
 Winners:  (Phil Dalhausser & Nick Lucena) (m) /  (Larissa França & Talita Antunes) (f)
 June 15 – 18:  Three Star #4 in  The Hague
 Winners:  (Nikita Lyamin & Viacheslav Krasilnikov) (m) /  (Carolina Solberg Salgado & Maria Elisa Antonelli) (f)
 October 11 – 15: Three Star #5 (final) in  Qinzhou
 Winners:  (Maxim Sivolap & Igor Velichko) (m) /  (Mariafe Artacho & Taliqua Clancy) (f)

2017 Two Star BV events
 March 17 – 19: Two Star #1 in  Sydney #1 (women only)
 Winners:  (Julie Gordon & Camille Saxton)
 June 16 – 18: Two Star #2 in  Nanjing (women only)
 Winners:  (Kelley Larsen & Betsi Flint)
 June 23 – 25: Two Star #3 in  Nantong (women only)
 Winners:  (Wen Shuhui & Xia Xinyi)
 July 28 – 30: Two Star #4 in  Espinho, Portugal (men only)
 Winners:  (George Souto Maior Wanderley & Vitor Gonçalves Felipe)
 November 22 – 26: Two Star #5 (final) in  Sydney #2
 Winners:  (Ben Saxton & Grant O'Gorman) (m) /  (Mariafe Artacho del Solar & Taliqua Clancy) (f)

2017 One Star BV events
 March 4 & 5: One Star #1 in  Shepparton
 Winners:  (Christopher McHugh & Damien Schumann) (m) /  (Julie Gordon & Camille Saxton) (f)
 April 15 & 16: One Star #2 in  Langkawi
 Winners:  (Diaz Gomez Nivaldo Nadir & Sergio González) (m) /  (Emily Stockman & Kimberly Dicello) (f)
 Winners:  (Juliana Silva & Carolina Horta Maximo)
 June 23 & 24: One Star #4 in  Pacific Harbour
 Note 1: This event was postponed from the January 12 – 14 dates, following heavy rainfall and flooding in Fiji.
 Note 2: This event was officially cancelled, due to financial difficulties.
 July 14 – 16: One Star #5 in  Daegu (women only)
 Winners:  (Miki Ishii & Megumi Murakami)
 July 20 – 22: One Star #6 in  Ulsan (women only)
 Winners:  (Betsi Flint & Kelley Larsen)
 July 21 – 23: One Star #7 in  Agadir
 Winners:  (Youssef Krou & Quincy Aye) (m) /  (Nicole Eiholzer & Dunja Gerson) (f)
 September 7 – 9: One Star #8 in  Montpellier (men only)
 Winners:  (Jan Pokeršnik & Nejc Zemljak)
 October 25 – 29: One Star #9 (final) in  Aalsmeer
 Winners:  (Enrico Rossi & Marco Caminati) (m) /  (Joy Stubbe & Madelein Meppelink) (f)

Indoor Volleyball

National team competitions

2017 FIVB Volleyball World League
 June 17 & 18: Group 3 Finals in  León
  defeated , 3–0 in matches played, in the final.  took third place.
 June 24 & 25: Group 2 Finals in  Gold Coast
  defeated , 3–0 in matches played, in the final.  took third place.
 July 4 – 8: Group 1 Finals in  Curitiba
  defeated , 3–2 in matches played, in the final.  took third place.

2017 FIVB Volleyball World Grand Prix
 July 22 & 23: Group 3 Finals in  Canberra
  defeated , 3–0 in matches played, in the final.  took third place.
 July 29 & 30: Group 2 Finals in  Ostrava
  defeated , 3–0 in matches played, in the final.  took third place.
 August 2 – 6: Group 1 Finals in  Nanjing
  defeated , 3–2 in matches played, in the final.  took third place.

CEV
 October 18, 2016 – April 23, 2017: 2016–17 CEV Women's Champions League
  Vakıfbank Istanbul defeated  Imoco Volley Conegliano, 3–0 in matches played, to win their third CEV Women's Champions League title.
  Eczacıbaşı VitrA Istanbul took third place.
 Note: Both Vakibank and Imoco Volley have qualified to compete at the 2017 FIVB Volleyball Women's Club World Championship event.
 November 2, 2016 – April 30, 2017: 2016–17 CEV Champions League
  VC Zenit-Kazan defeated  Sir Sicoma Colussi Perugia, 3–0 in matches played, to win their third consecutive and fifth overall CEV Champions League title.
  Cucine Lube Civitanova took third place.
 November 8, 2016 – April 16, 2017: 2016–17 CEV Challenge Cup
  Fakel Novy Urengoy defeated  Chaumont Volleyball 52, 6–2 in matches played, to win their first CEV Challenge Cup title.
 December 6, 2016 – April 15, 2017: 2016–17 Men's CEV Cup
  Tours VB defeated  Diatec Trentino, 15–13 in the golden set, to win their first Men's CEV Cup title.
 December 13, 2016 – April 15, 2017: 2016–17 Women's CEV Cup
  Dynamo Kazan defeated  Futura Volley Busto Arsizio, 6–3 in matches played, to win their first Women's CEV Cup title.
 December 13, 2016 – April 15, 2017: 2016–17 CEV Women's Challenge Cup
  Bursa BBSK defeated  Olympiacos Piraeus, 5–3 in matches played, to win their second CEV Women's Challenge Cup title.
 April 1 – 9: 2017 Girls' U18 Volleyball European Championship in  Arnhem
  defeated , 3–2 in matches played, to win their second consecutive and third overall Girls' U18 Volleyball European Championship title.
  took third place.
 Note: Along with the three national teams mentioned above, and  all qualified to compete in the 2017 FIVB Volleyball Girls' U18 World Championship.
 April 22 – 30: 2017 Boys' U19 Volleyball European Championship in  Győr and  Púchov
 The  defeated , 3–2 in matches played, to win their first Boys' U19 Volleyball European Championship title.
  took third place.
 Note: Along the three teams mentioned here, and  all qualified to compete at the 2017 FIVB Volleyball Boys' U19 World Championship.
 August 24 – September 3: 2017 Men's European Volleyball Championship in 
  defeated , 3–2 in matches played, to win their 14th Men's European Volleyball Championship title.
  took third place.
 September 20 – October 1: 2017 Women's European Volleyball Championship in  Baku / Quba and  Tbilisi
  took third place.

AVC

NORCECA
 September 26 – October 1: 2017 Men's NORCECA Volleyball Championship in  Colorado Springs, Colorado
  took third place.
 Note: All teams mentioned above have qualified to compete at the 2018 FIVB Volleyball Men's World Championship.
 September 26 – October 1: 2017 Women's NORCECA Volleyball Championship (Group B) in  Langley, British Columbia
 Champions: ; Second: ; Third: ; Fourth: 
 Note: Canada and Cuba have qualified to compete at the 2018 FIVB Volleyball Women's World Championship.
 October 11 – 16: 2017 Women's NORCECA Volleyball Championship (Group A) in  Santo Domingo
 Champions: ; Second: ; Third: ; Fourth: 
 Note: The Dominican Republic and Puerto Rico have qualified to compete at the 2018 FIVB Volleyball Women's World Championship.
 October 11 – 16: 2017 Women's NORCECA Volleyball Championship (Group C) in 
 Champions: ; Second: ; Third: ; Fourth: 
 Note: Mexico and Trinidad & Tobago have qualified to compete at the 2018 FIVB Volleyball Women's World Championship.

CSV
 February 12 – 19: 2017 Women's South American Volleyball Club Championship in  Uberlândia
  Rexona Sesc defeated fellow Brazilian team, Dentil/Praia Clube, 3–1 in matches played, to win their third consecutive and fourth overall Women's South American Volleyball Club Championship title.
  Universidad San Martín took third place.
 Note: Rexona Sesc has qualified to compete at the 2017 FIVB Volleyball Women's Club World Championship.
 February 19 – 26: 2017 Men's South American Volleyball Club Championship in  Montes Claros
  Sada Cruzeiro defeated  Personal Bolívar, 3–0 in matches played, to win their second consecutive and fourth overall Men's South American Volleyball Club Championship title.
  UPCN San Juan took third place.
 Note: Sada Cruzeiro has qualified to compete at the 2017 FIVB Volleyball Men's Club World Championship.
 August 5 – 12: 2017 Men's South American Volleyball Championship in  Santiago
  defeated , 3–0 in matches played, to win their 31st Men's South American Volleyball Championship title.
  took third place.
 Note: Brazil has qualified to compete at the 2018 FIVB Volleyball Men's World Championship.
 August 15 – 19: 2017 Women's South American Volleyball Championship in  Cali
 Champions: ; Second: ; Third: 
 Note: Brazil has qualified to compete at the 2018 FIVB Volleyball Women's World Championship.
 October 11 – 15: 2017 Girls' U16 South American Volleyball Championship in  Asunción
  defeated , 3–1 in matches played, to win their first Girls' U16 South American Volleyball Championship title.
  took third place.

NORCECA and CSV
 March 18 – 26: 2017 Boys' Youth Pan-American Volleyball Cup in  Monterrey
  defeated , 3–0 in matches played, to win their first Boys' Youth Pan-American Volleyball Cup title.
  took third place.
 Note: All three teams mentioned above have qualified to compete at the 2017 FIVB Volleyball Boys' U19 World Championship.
 March 26 – April 3: 2017 Girls' Youth Pan-American Volleyball Cup in  Havana
  defeated , 3–0 in matches played, to win their first Girls' Youth Pan-American Volleyball Cup title.
 The  took third place.
 Note: Along with Colombia and Cuba,  have qualified to compete at the 2017 FIVB Volleyball Girls' U18 World Championship.
 May 6 – 14: 2017 Women's Junior Pan-American Volleyball Cup in  San José, Costa Rica
 The  defeated , 3–0 in matches played, to win their first Women's Junior Pan-American Volleyball Cup title.
  took third place.
 Note: Both the United States and Argentina have qualified to compete at the 2017 FIVB Volleyball Women's U20 World Championship.
 May 14 – 22: 2017 Men's Junior Pan-American Volleyball Cup in  Fort McMurray
  defeated , 3–1 in matches played, to win their second consecutive Men's Junior Pan-American Volleyball Cup title.
  took third place.
 June 15 – 26: 2017 Women's Pan-American Volleyball Cup in  Lima & Cañete
  took third place.
 July 23 – 31: 2017 Men's Pan-American Volleyball Cup in  Gatineau
  defeated , 3–1 in matches played, to win their first Men's Pan-American Volleyball Cup title.
  took third place.

CAVB
 March 17 – 27: 2017 African Clubs Championship in  Tunis
  Al Ahly defeated  Étoile du Sahel, 3–1 in matches played, to win their 12th African Clubs Championship title. 
  Bourj Bouaririj took third place. 
 April 6 – 16: 2017 Women's African Clubs Championship in  Monastir, Tunisia
  Carthage defeated  Shams, 3–2 in matches played, to win their first Women's African Clubs Championship title.
  Prisons took third place.
 October 7 – 14: 2017 Women's African Volleyball Championship in  Yaoundé
  defeated , 3–0 in matches played, to win their first Women's African Volleyball Championship title.
  took third place.
 Note: Cameroon and Kenya both qualified to compete at the 2018 FIVB Volleyball Women's World Championship.
 October 22 – 29: 2017 Men's African Volleyball Championship in  Cairo
  defeated , 3–0 in matches played, to win their ninth Men's African Volleyball Championship title.
  took third place.
 Note: The three teams mentioned above all qualified to compete at the 2018 FIVB Volleyball Men's World Championship.

Notes

References

External links
 FIVB - Fédération Internationale de Volleyball (International Volleyball Federation)

 
 
Volleyball by year